No Sound But a Heart is Sheena Easton's eighth studio album, released in 1987 on the EMI America label. The album was issued in the Canadian, Mexican and Asian markets. The album consists of midtempo and ballad songs, including the single and video, "Eternity", written by Prince. The disc features Steve Perry from Journey on backing vocals on "Still in Love" and a duet with Eugene Wilde on "What If We Fall In Love".

The release of No Sound But a Heart was hampered in the United States after EMI America was absorbed into EMI Manhattan Records and two scheduled release dates for the album (February and June 1987) were not met. The album was reissued in 1999 by the One Way Records label, marking the first time it had been officially available in the United States.  The 1999 reissue added several bonus tracks including "Shockwave" a non album b-side to "Eternity" and Easton's contributions to the soundtrack of the 1986 film About Last Night..., "Natural Love" and the Top 50 single "So Far, So Good".

This was Easton's final release on the EMI label. She moved to MCA Records the following year.

On July 12, 2019, RT Industries digitally released No Sound But A Heart.

Reviews
From a 1987 review in Rolling Stone magazine: "No Sound But a Heart is an interesting compromise. It keeps the emphasis on soul balladry, but backs its songs with solid R&B grooves."

Track listing
"Eternity" (Prince) - 4:17
"Still Willing to Try" (Keith Diamond) - 4:06
"Still in Love" (Jeffrey Cohen, Narada Michael Walden) featuring Steve Perry - 4:33
"Wanna Give My Love" (Dana Merino) - 3:55
"The Last to Know" (Phil Galdston, Brock Walsh) - 5:19
"No Sound But a Heart" (John Bettis, Patrick Leonard) - 4:19
"What If We Fall in Love" (Jon Buckingham) featuring Eugene Wilde - 4:09
"No Ordinary Love" (Keith Diamond, James Ingram) - 4:42
"Floating Hearts" (Jeffrey Cohen, Narada Michael Walden, Corrado Rustici) - 6:32

The 1999 reissue added the following bonus tracks
"Shockwave" B-side of "Eternity" (Sheena Easton, Jesse Johnson, Narada Michael Walden) - 5:42
"So Far So Good" from the Motion Picture About Last Night (Jimmy Mundy, Tom Snow, Cynthia Weil, Edward Little White) - 4:04
"Natural Love" from the Motion Picture About Last Night (Tom Snow, Cynthia Weil) - 3:50
"It's Christmas All Over the World" from the Motion Picture Santa Claus: The Movie - 4:54

Personnel 
 Sheena Easton – lead vocals, backing vocals (3-6, 8)
 Kim Bullard – keyboards (1), synthesizers (1)
 Prince – keyboards (1), guitar (1)
 Keith Diamond – keyboards (2, 6, 8), synth bass (2, 6, 8) drums (2, 6, 8), arrangements (2, 6, 8), Fairlight CMI (8)
 Skip Anderson – keyboards (2, 6)
 Walter Afanasieff – keyboards (3, 7, 9), synthesizers (3, 7, 9)
 David Sancious – keyboards (3, 9), synthesizers (3, 9), synth sax solo (9)
 Chuck Kentis – synthesizers (4)
 Arthur Stead – synthesizers (4)
 Randy Cantor – keyboards (5)
 Preston Glass – synthesizers (7), bells (7)
 Jeff Smith – programming (8)
 Ira Siegel – guitar (2)
 Corrado Rustici – Charvel GTM6 rhythm guitar (3, 9), lead guitar (7)
 John McCurry – guitar (4)
 Ron Jennings – guitar (5)
 Paul Pesco – guitar (8)
 Randy Jackson – Moog Source bass (3), bass guitar (7, 9)
 Neil Jason – bass guitar (4)
 Doug Grigsby – bass guitar (5)
 Wayne Brathwaite – fretless bass (6)
 Doug Wimbish – bass guitar (8) 
 Narada Michael Walden – LinnDrum (3, 9), programming (3, 9), arrangements (3, 7, 9), drums (7)
 Gigi Gonaway – Simmons tom tom (3), cymbal (3)
 Steve Holley – drums (4)
 Jim Salamone – drums (5)
 Bill Hendrickson – cymbal (9)
 Todd Hemmenway – cello (1)
 Alan Rubin – trumpet (2, 6), flugelhorn (2, 6)
 Lew Soloff – trumpet (2, 6), flugelhorn (2, 6)
 John Clark – French horn (2)
 Peter Jon Gordon – French horn (2)
 Toots Thielemans – harmonica (5)
 Lawrence Feldman – alto flute (6), tenor saxophone (6)
 Dave Tofani – alto flute (6), alto saxophone (6)
 Danny Wilensky – saxophone (8)
 Randy Peterson – vocal arrangements (1)
 Leon Pendarvis – horn arrangements (2, 6), string arrangements (2, 6), conductor (2, 6)
 Doriane Elliot – music contractor (2, 6)
 Vicki Genfan – music contractor (2, 6)
 Jerry Hey – string arrangements (3, 7)
 Phil Ramone – arrangements (4)
 Nick Martinelli – arrangements (5)
 Jack Faith – string arrangements (5)
 Steve Perry – backing vocals (3)
 Rory Dodd – backing vocals (4)
 Merrick Norman – backing vocals (4)
 Eric Troyer – backing vocals (4)
 Armand Pocaraba – backing vocals (5)
 Eugene Wilde – lead vocals (7)
 Janice Dempsey – backing vocals (8)
 Lisa Fischer – backing vocals (8)
 B.J. Nelson – backing vocals (8)
 Kitty Beethoven – backing vocals (9)
 Jim Gilstrap – backing vocals (9)
 Jennifer Hall – backing vocals (9)
 Alex Ligertwood – backing vocals (9)

Production 
 Producers – David Leonard (Track 1); Keith Diamond (Tracks 2, 6 & 8); Narada Michael Walden (Tracks 3, 7 & 9-12); Phil Ramone (Track 4); Nick Martinelli (Track 5); Keith Olsen (Track 13).
 Engineers – David Leonard (Track 1); J.C. Convertino (Tracks 2 & 6); Bob Rosa (Tracks 2, 6 & 8); David Frazer (Tracks 3, 7 & 9); Jimmy Bayer (Track 4); Gene Leone, Scott MacMillan and Michael Tarsia (Track 5); Matthew Kasher (Track 8).
 Assistant Engineers – Bino Espinoza and David Knight (Track 1); Ed Bruder (Tracks 2, 6 & 8); Tony Masciaratte (Tracks 2 & 6); Dana Jon Chappelle (Tracks 3, 7 & 9); Tim Leitner (Track 4); Randy Abrams (Track 5); Robert Brockman, Mark Partis, Angela Piva, Roey Shamir and Tom Vercillo (Track 8).
 Recorded at Sunset Sound Factory (Hollywood, CA); Tarpan Studios (San Rafael, CA); Unique Recording Studios, The Hit Factory and Soundtrack Studios (New York, NY); Sigma Sound Studios (Pittsburgh, PA).
 Mixing – Bob Rosa (Tracks 2, 6 & 8); David Frazer (Tracks 3, 7 & 9); Michael Tarsia (Track 5).
 Mixed at Soundcastle (Santa Monica, CA); Tarpan Studios, Unique Recording Studios, Soundtrack Studios and Sigma Sound Studios.
 Remixing on Track 5 by Julian Mendelsohn at Sarm Studios (London, England).
 Mastered by Wally Traugott at Capitol Records (Hollywood, CA).
 Production Coordination – Lorraine Rebidas (Track 1); Joseph D'Ambrosio (Track 4)
 Art Direction – Henry Marquez
 Design – Tommy Steele
 Photography – Marco Franciosa and Herb Ritts
 Management – Harriet Wasserman

References
[ No Sound But a Heart] at Allmusic

1987 albums
1999 albums
Sheena Easton albums
Albums produced by Phil Ramone
Albums produced by David Leonard (record producer)
Albums produced by Narada Michael Walden
EMI Records albums